Markus Affolter (born 3 June 1958, in Seeberg BE) is a Swiss Developmental Biologist and Professor at the Biozentrum University of Basel, Switzerland.

Life 
Markus Affolter studied Biology at the ETH Zurich and at Laval University in Quebec City, Canada. Following his PhD from Laval University in 1988, he worked as a postdoctoral fellow at the Biozentrum, University of Basel. In the laboratory of Professor Walter Gehring, Markus Affolter began his research with the fruit fly Drosophila melanogaster. In 2000 he became Assistant Professor and in 2005 Professor of Developmental Biology at the Biozentrum, University of Basel.

Work 
Affolter researches  the cellular and molecular processes involved in the formation of organs and blood vessel networks in the fruit fly Drosophila melanogaster and zebrafish. He has extensively used live-imaging, high-resolution microscopy in studying network formation in these animals, work which has enabled the better understanding of the function of molecules in morphogenesis. His  lab has shown, in collaboration with the University of Freiburg, Germany and the University of Lausanne, that the morphogen Dpp and the feedback regulator Pentagone have key functions in proportional tissue growth (scaling) in the wing disc of the fruit fly.

Awards and honors

 1983: K.M. Hunter Award from the National Cancer Institute of Canada
1999: Elected member of the European Molecular Biology Organization (EMBO) 
2008: Elected member of the German National Academy of Sciences Leopoldina

External links 
Research Group Website

Video links 
"The Dawn of Life" Cells into organs.
University of Basel, Interview Prof. Dr. Markus Affolter

References 

Living people
ETH Zurich alumni
Université Laval alumni
Members of the European Molecular Biology Organization
Biozentrum University of Basel
University of Basel alumni
1958 births